David Moher (born April 17, 1957) is an Irish epidemiologist and senior scientist in the Clinical Epidemiology Program at the Ottawa Hospital Research Institute (OHRI), where he is also Director of the  for Journalology, and the Canadian EQUATOR Centre. He is also an associate professor and University Research Chair at the University of Ottawa. An expert on systematic reviews in medical science, he played a major role in the development of both the PRISMA and CONSORT statements. He is a co-editor-in-chief of the peer-reviewed journal Systematic Reviews. He has been recognised as an ISI Highly Cited Researcher, and received the Grimes Research Career Achievement Award from OHRI in 2015.

Biography
Moher grew up in Dublin, Ireland, where he had undiagnosed dyslexia while in elementary school. This prevented him from learning to read and write until he was thirteen. He received his BSW from St Mary's College, Dublin in 1980, his B.A. in psychology from Queen's University in 1983, and his M.Sc. from Queen's University in 1986. In 2004, he received his Ph.D. in clinical epidemiology and biostatistics from the University of Amsterdam. He became an associate professor in the Department of Epidemiology and Community Medicine at the University of Ottawa in 2004, and was named a University Research Chair there in 2006. He has been a senior scientist in the Knowledge Synthesis Group at the Ottawa Hospital Research Institute since 2008, and the co-editor-in-chief of Systematic Reviews since 2011.

References

External links
Faculty page

Living people
1957 births
Irish epidemiologists
Academic staff of the University of Ottawa
Irish emigrants to Canada
Medical journal editors
Irish medical researchers
Queen's University at Kingston alumni
University of Amsterdam alumni
Medical doctors from Dublin (city)
Irish scholars and academics